Castle Skull, first published in 1931, is a detective story by John Dickson Carr which features Carr's first series detective, Henri Bencolin. This novel is a mystery of the type known as a whodunnit.

Plot summary

Around the start of the 20th century, a shadowy stage magician named Maleger tours the world, performing feats so mysterious and hideous that his act frightens children and even adults. In 1912, he purchases the famous Schloss Schadel, or "Castle Skull", on the banks of the Rhine River in Germany, and he transforms the ruin into a nightmarish place consistent with its terrifying history (including scenes of torture, insanity and suicide). Maleger later disappears on a train trip, and partial remains found in the Rhine are officially identified as his. Suspicions swirl around the case, with conflicting theories that the magician died in an accident, committed suicide, was murdered, or even faked his own death.

In the years afterward, the magician becomes an almost legendary figure, and the castle endures as a grim landmark. Meanwhile, two of Maleger's very few friends become famous in their own right. One of these is American actor Myron Alison, who owns a large home just across the river from Castle Skull. The other is Belgian financier Jérôme D'Aunay, one of the world's richest men. One night in the late 1920s, Alison pays a mysterious visit to the castle, where he is spotted running in distress. Help arrives too late, but it's clear that he was murdered -- first shot, then doused in kerosene and set afire. D'Aunay, expressing fears that others will die, hires legendary Paris detective Henri Bencolin and his associate Jeff Marle to investigate the bizarre slaying.

Bencolin, who sets up his headquarters in Alison's former home, finds himself dealing with a weird cast of suspects and an array of seemingly incomprehensible clues. He also has to re-examine old rumors about what really happened to Maleger years before. Because the case has attracted so much publicity, Bencolin has to compete in his investigation with Germany's greatest detective, who was once his rival in wartime espionage.

1931 American novels
Novels by John Dickson Carr